The 1970 Paris–Tours was the 64th edition of the Paris–Tours cycle race and was held on 2 October 1970. The race started in Paris and finished in Tours. The race was won by Jürgen Tschan of the Peugeot team.

General classification

References

1970 in French sport
1970
1970 Super Prestige Pernod
October 1970 sports events in Europe